Dumfries is an unincorporated community in Glasgow Township, Wabasha County, Minnesota, United States.

Geography
The community is located between Wabasha and Zumbro Falls along State Highway 60 (MN 60). Wabasha County Roads 20, 30, and 86 are also in the immediate area. Trout Brook and the Zumbro River meet near Dumfries. Other nearby places include Wabasha, West Albany, Theilman, Kellogg, and Zumbro Falls.

History
A post office called Dumfries was established in 1894, and remained in operation until 1912. The community was named after Dumfries in Scotland.

References

Unincorporated communities in Minnesota
Unincorporated communities in Wabasha County, Minnesota
Rochester metropolitan area, Minnesota